Lalthuammawia Ralte (orn 28 November 1992), known as Mawia, is an Indian footballer who plays as a goalkeeper for Indian Super League club Odisha.

Career

Shillong Lajong
In the summer of 2011 Ralte signed with newly promoted club Shillong Lajong to play in the I-League. He then made his debut for the club against Churchill Brothers on 17 September 2011 in the 2011 Indian Federation Cup. The match ended 3–1 to Churchill. He helped the club then reach the semi-finals of the Federation Cup against Salgaocar where Lajong would lose 1–0 on 25 September 2011 at the Salt Lake Stadium in Kolkata.

Bengaluru FC
In the summer of 2014 Ralte joined defending I-League champions, Bengaluru FC. On 17 January 2015, Mawia made his debut for Bengaluru FC against Dempo at Bangalore Football Stadium in which he was able to kept his first clean sheet. In his debut season with Bengaluru, he has made 20 appearances and has helped them to win I-League. On 4 February 2015, Mawia made his AFC Champions League debut against Johor Darul Ta'zim at Larkin Stadium Malaysia.  He signed a two-year contract with Bengaluru at the end of the season, which would keep him at the club until the end of the 2016-17 I-League season.

NorthEast United FC (loan)
In July 2015 Ralte was drafted to play for NorthEast United FC in the 2015 Indian Super League.

FC Goa

In January after zero games plays with FC Goa, he was loaned to Kerala Blasters FC.

Kerala Blasters FC

Ralte was signed in into the Blasters courtesy of swapping deal midway through the 2018-19 Indian Super League season by FC Goa and them. Ralte was sent on loan to Blasters while then Kerala Blasters goalkeeper Naveen Kumar was sent on loan to FC Goa from Blasters. Still Ralte didn't feature in a single game for the club and returned to Goa after the loan period.

East Bengal FC (loan)
In June 2019 Ralte is drafted to play for East Bengal in the 2019-20 I-League season.

Bengaluru
In the summer of 2020 Ralte joined his former club and 2018-19 Indian Super League champions, Bengaluru.

Odisha
In July 2022, Odisha successfully signed Ralte on a two-year deal. On 17 August, he made his debut for the club against NorthEast United in the Durand Cup, in a thumping 6–0 win. He assisted Nandha Kumar for their second goal.

Career statistics

Club

References

Indian footballers
1992 births
Living people
I-League players
People from Champhai
Footballers from Mizoram
Shillong Lajong FC players
Bengaluru FC players
NorthEast United FC players
FC Goa players
Kerala Blasters FC players
Association football goalkeepers
East Bengal Club players
Indian Super League players